Bethany Meilani Hamilton (born February 8, 1990) is an American professional surfer and writer who survived a 2003 shark attack in which her left arm was bitten off and who ultimately returned to professional surfing. She wrote about her experience in the 2004 autobiography, Soul Surfer: A True Story of Faith, Family, and Fighting to Get Back on the Board, which was adapted into the 2011 feature film, Soul Surfer, in which she attributes her strength to her Christian faith. She was also the subject of a 2018 documentary, Bethany Hamilton: Unstoppable, which discusses her marriage to Adam Dirks and how marriage and motherhood have affected her professional surfing career.

Early life 
Hamilton was born on February 8, 1990, to Tom and Cheri Hamilton in Lihue, Hawaii. She has two older brothers named Noah and Timothy. After learning how to surf at the age of three, she began surfing competitively at the age of eight and gained her first sponsorship by age ten. She was home-schooled from sixth grade through high school by her mother, a housewife. Her father was a waiter at a town café. She is a Christian.

Shark attack and recovery
On October 31, 2003, Hamilton, age 13 at the time, went for a morning surf along Tunnels Beach, Kauai, in shark infested waters, with her best friend, Alana Blanchard, as well as Alana's father and brother. While she was lying on her surfboard stomach-down and talking with Alana, a  tiger shark attacked her. It swiftly bit off her left arm, which she had been dangling in the water, just below the shoulder. The Blanchards helped paddle her back to shore, then Alana's father fashioned a tourniquet out of a rash guard and wrapped it around the stump of her arm. She was rushed to Wilcox Memorial Hospital. By the time she arrived there, she had lost over 60% of her blood and was in hypovolemic shock. A doctor at a nearby hotel raced to the hospital in order to treat her. Her father, who was scheduled to have knee surgery that same morning, was already there, but she took his place in the operating room. During subsequent media interviews, she confirmed that she felt normal when she was bitten and did not feel much pain from the bite, but felt numb on the way to the hospital.

When the news of the shark attack broke, a family of fishermen led by Ralph Young presented to investigators photos of a  tiger shark they had caught and killed about one mile from the attack site. It had surfboard debris in its mouth. When measurements of its mouth were compared with those of Hamilton's broken board, it matched. In late 2004, the police officially confirmed that it was the same one that had attacked her.

Despite the trauma of the incident, Hamilton was determined to return to surfing. One month later, she did so.

Initially, Hamilton adopted a custom-made board that was longer and slightly thicker than standard and had a handle for her right arm, making it easier to paddle, and she learned to kick more to make up for the loss of her left arm. After teaching herself to surf with one arm, she returned to surfing on November 26, 2003, just 26 days after the attack and entered her first major competition on January 10, 2004. She now uses standard competitive performance short-boards. The shark-bitten surfboard that she was riding during the attack, as well as the swimsuit she was wearing, a gift from ocean photographer Aaron Chang, are on display at the California Surf Museum in Oceanside, California.

Media
Since the attack, Hamilton has appeared as a guest on numerous television shows. Her manager, Roy "Dutch" Hofstetter, who went on to produce the film Soul Surfer, managed her rise through the media from shark attack victim to inspirational role model. The television shows she has appeared on include The Amazing Race, The Biggest Loser, 20/20, Good Morning America, Inside Edition, The Oprah Winfrey Show, The Ellen DeGeneres Show, The Today Show, The Tonight Show and Dude Perfect, as well as in the magazines People, Time, and American Girl. Additionally she was the cover story in the first issue of NiNe magazine.

Hamilton has participated in multiple public speaking events and is "motivating audiences worldwide to live their life with more tenacity, courage, and faith".

In 2004, Hamilton won the ESPY Award for Best Comeback Athlete and also received the Courage Teen Choice Award.

In 2004, MTV Books published Hamilton's book, Soul Surfer: A True Story of Faith, Family, and Fighting to Get Back on the Board, which describes her ordeal. Her story is also told in the 2007 short subject documentary film Heart of a Soul Surfer. Described as a "faith-based documentary", the film addresses her devout Christianity and the courage and faith in Jesus Christ in the aftermath of the shark attack, and follows her quest for spiritual meaning.

In 2009, Hamilton was a contestant on Are You Smarter Than a Fifth Grader? and won $25,000. In 2010, she appeared on an episode of ABC's Extreme Makeover: Home Edition.

In 2011, Hamilton appeared in a video for the Christian organization I Am Second, telling of her struggle after the shark attack and how she trusted in God to get her through it. In 2011, a feature film Soul Surfer, based on her 2004 book, was released in theaters. She was portrayed by actress AnnaSophia Robb. She performed all the one-armed surfing stunts in it.

Hamilton also appeared on the TLC series 19 Kids and Counting the same year, in the episode titled "Duggars Under the Sea", when the Duggar family visited her in Atlanta, Georgia.

Hamilton plays herself in the film Dolphin Tale 2, which revolves around the baby dolphin Hope's story. She and her husband, Adam Dirks, competed as a team on the 25th season of The Amazing Race, finishing in third place. It premiered in 2014 on CBS.

Bethany Hamilton: Unstoppable is set to tell the story of Hamilton's transition from childhood to motherhood. "From chasing her toddler to chasing the biggest waves. Bethany is continuously rewriting the rules on being a fearless athlete, and brings a new meaning to the phrase, 'Surf Like a Girl'".

Hamilton was featured in a short film by RipCurl titled Master and Apprentice alongside young female surfer Erin Brooks.

Personal life 
In early 2012, Hamilton met youth minister Adam Dirks through mutual friends. They became engaged in 2013. They were married on August 18, 2013, at an estate on Kauai's north shore, near where she grew up. They have three sons, born June 1, 2015, March 27, 2018, and February 14, 2021, respectively. Their marriage is featured throughout her documentary, Bethany Hamilton: Unstoppable. Along with being a professional surfer, she now offers mentorship classes on faith, healing, personal health, and relationships.

Books 
Hamilton has published eight books with her mom publishing one about her story.

Outreach programs 
Hamilton is involved in numerous charitable efforts, including her own foundation, Friends of Bethany, which reaches out to amputees and youth, encouraging them to overcome difficulties by offering hope through Jesus Christ. Using her platform as a professional athlete to promote living a fit and healthy lifestyle, she authored the book Body and Soul in 2014. In 2019, a surf documentary was made about her, Bethany Hamilton: Unstoppable, which was accompanied by a photo book and a children's book.

Within the Friends of Bethany Foundation there are four different programs:

 Beautifully Flawed: retreat designed for young women ages 14–25 who have experienced traumatic limb loss. Six events hosted annually through this program which include: guests speakers, practical health and wellness tips which specifically account for limb loss, postural training, and surf lessons.
 Shine Forth: Night filled with stories and inspiration to overcome, free community event to gather together and share comeback stories. Bethany also does a book signing at this event, which is hosted annually.
 Anchored in Love: Conference for girls and young women ages 12 and up, one day event designed to help girls and young women discover their true beauty, purpose, and worth. Event is held annually in San Diego and features several guest speakers.
 The Forge: Men's retreat where young male amputees come and focus on faith, fitness, and healthy living. This program is run by Bethany, her husband, and friend/mentor Mike Coots.

Surfing career

In January 2023, Hamilton announced that she would boycott all World Surf League events following their decision to allow transgender women to compete in the female category provided they maintain a testosterone level below 5nmol/L for 12 months prior. She questioned whether hormone levels were a fair and accurate assessment of sex, stating that transgender athletes should have a separate division created for them. She said transgender women have a biological advantage that female surfers do not, stating, "We are seeing glimpses of male-bodied dominance in women's sports like running, swimming and others." She said that she believes that many of the women currently on tour agree with her but are too afraid of being ostracized to speak out. Her stance received support from some but was criticized by others as transphobic.

References

External links

 
 CBS News interview
 Bethany Hamilton Video produced by Makers: Women Who Make America
 Bethany Hamilton and the Teeth of the Tiger
 Surfer Girls – Bethany Hamilton
 

1990 births
Living people
21st-century American non-fiction writers
21st-century American women writers
21st-century Christians
The Amazing Race (American TV series) contestants
American amputees
American autobiographers
American disabled sportspeople
American motivational speakers
American surfers
Sportspeople with limb difference
Christians from Hawaii
American female surfers
People from Lihue, Hawaii
Shark attack victims
Sportspeople from Hawaii
Women autobiographers
Writers from Hawaii
American women non-fiction writers